The 1934 All-Ireland Junior Hurling Championship was the 17th staging of the All-Ireland Junior Championship since its establishment by the Gaelic Athletic Association in 1912.

Tipperary entered the championship as the defending champions, however, they were beaten by Cork in the Munster first round.

The All-Ireland final was played on 4 November 1934 at St. Conleth's Park in Newbridge, between Waterford and London, in what was their first ever meeting in a final. Waterford won the match by 3-05 to 3-03 to claim their second championship title overall and a first title since 1931.

Results

All-Ireland Junior Hurling Championship

All-Ireland semi-finals

All-Ireland home final

All-Ireland final

References

Junior
All-Ireland Junior Hurling Championship